Carex thornei is a tussock-forming species of perennial sedge in the family Cyperaceae. It is native to south eastern parts of the United States.

See also
List of Carex species

References

thornei
Flora of Alabama
Flora of Georgia (U.S. state)
Flora of Florida